"Blame It on the Rain" is a song written by Diane Warren and performed by the German dance-pop group Milli Vanilli. It was released as a new track from the group's North American debut album, Girl You Know It's True (1989), and did not appear on All or Nothing (1988), their debut album in other regions. An extended remix of the song did appear on The U.S.-Remix Album: All or Nothing (1989), which served to release the new tracks included on Girl You Know It's True that did not appear on All or Nothing outside of North America.

The song is written in the second person, and the protagonist is advising the listener to "blame it on the rain" and other natural elements after leaving their lover and regretting it. The song topped the US Billboard Hot 100, becoming Milli Vanilli's third and final single to do so. It also reached the top 10 in Australia, Canada, and New Zealand, as well as in several European countries. In the United Kingdom, the song did not enter the top 40, peaking at number 52.

Background
The song had originally been intended for the sibling group the Jets. When the band did not record it, Arista Records president Clive Davis suggested to Warren that it would be a good fit for Milli Vanilli.

Composition
The verses are in the key of B major and modulate up one step to B major for the main chorus and modulate once more to C major during the final repetition of the chorus. It is originally 98 beats per minute and features a sparse bass line and heavy handclaps. The music video version of the song differs in a few ways, most noticeably in the longer length and brass synth introduction absent in the album and single variations.

Chart performance
"Blame It on the Rain" debuted on the US Billboard Hot 100 on 7 October 1989, at number sixty-five. Seven weeks later, for the week ending 25 November 1989, it reached number one, and occupied the spot for two weeks. It also spent a total of twenty-three weeks on the Hot 100. The song became Milli Vanilli's third number one single on the Hot 100 after "Baby Don't Forget My Number" and "Girl I'm Gonna Miss You". The song was ranked at number 21 on Billboards Year-End Singles list for 1989 and at number 46 for 1990.

Critical reception
Harriet Dell from Smash Hits wrote, "Like "Girl You Know It's True" the dreadlocked boys of the too-tight-trouser fame have come up with another pleasant pop hit. It smooches along at a George Michael type pace, with some topper backing singers and some fab electronic goings on. This is surprisingly good...mmm, I'd even go as far as to say...I like it!"

Track listings
 CD maxi
 "Blame It on the Rain" (club mix) – 7:02
 "Baby Don't Forget My Number" (European mix) – 4:55

 7-inch single
 "Blame It on the Rain" – 4:08

 12-inch maxi
 "Blame It on the Rain" (club mix) – 7:15
 "Blame It on the Rain" (radio version) – 4:08

Charts

Weekly charts

Year-end charts

Certifications

References

1989 songs
1989 singles
Arista Records singles
Billboard Hot 100 number-one singles
Cashbox number-one singles
Hansa Records singles
Milli Vanilli songs
Songs written by Diane Warren
Song recordings produced by Frank Farian